Rugby Club Valencia (also known as Tecnidex Valencia) is a Spanish rugby team. The club competes in Group East of División de Honor B.

History
The club was established in May 1966 by a group of young players who wanted to see a team from the city of Valencia playing in the national leagues. There were problems securing a field, and the club played on a football field in Picanya and sometimes on the river banks by the teachers' training college in the early years. They acquired their own ground, the Campo de La Pechina (Field of The Pendant), the very first rugby ground in the city.

The following season a youth team was started, which won the regional championship.

The senior team reached the national leagues in 1973/1974 for the first time, and was promoted to the División de Honor in the 1976/1977 season, winning the title in 1982/1983.

In 1990 the club gained their primary sponsor, Tecnidex, a company providing chemicals and disinfectants for agricultural purposes.

Honours
División de Honor: 1
1983
División de Honor B: 3
1976, 1993, 2002
Valencian Regional Championship: 5
1968, 1970, 1972, 1974, 2012

Season by season

22 seasons in División de Honor

External links
Official website
Tecnidex

Spanish rugby union teams
Rugby clubs established in 1966
Sport in Valencia
Sports teams in the Valencian Community